The 1974–75 season was the 20th season of the European Cup, an annual football tournament for the champion clubs of the member nations of UEFA (the Union of European Football Associations). It was won for the second consecutive time by Bayern Munich in the final against Leeds United, the first English side to reach the final since Manchester United won it seven years earlier and only the second in the history of the competition.

Bracket

First round

|}
Byes: Bayern Munich (West Germany), Magdeburg (GDR), and Cork Celtic (Ireland, drawn against Omonia, who withdrew due to the political situation in Cyprus). 

Italian club Lazio was disqualified before the draw.

First leg

Second leg

Ruch Chorzów won 2–1 on aggregate.

Fenerbahçe won 5–2 on aggregate.

Hajduk Split won 9–1 on aggregate.

Saint-Étienne won 3–1 on aggregate.

Ararat Yerevan won 6–2 on aggregate.

Újpesti Dózsa won 7–1 on aggregate.

Leeds United won 5–3 on aggregate.

5–5 on aggregate; Anderlecht won on away goals.

Olympiacos won 3–1 on aggregate.

Feyenoord won 11–1 on aggregate.

Barcelona won 5–0 on aggregate.

HJK won 4–2 on aggregate.

Åtvidaberg won 4–3 on aggregate.

Second round

|}

First leg

Second leg

Ruch Chorzów won 4–1 on aggregate.

Saint-Étienne won 6–5 on aggregate.

Bayern Munich won 5–3 on aggregate.

Ararat Yerevan won 7–1 on aggregate.

Leeds United won 5–1 on aggregate.

Anderlecht won 5–4 on aggregate.

Barcelona won 3–0 on aggregate.

Åtvidaberg won 4–0 on aggregate.

Quarter-finals

|}

First leg

Second leg

Saint-Étienne won 4–3 on aggregate.

Bayern Munich won 2–1 on aggregate.

Leeds United won 4–0 on aggregate.

Barcelona won 5–0 on aggregate.

Semi-finals

|}

First leg

Second leg

Bayern Munich won 2–0 on aggregate.

Leeds United won 3–2 on aggregate.

Final

Top scorers
The top scorers from the 1974–75 European Cup are as follows:

References

External links

 1974–75 All matches – season at UEFA website
 European Cup results at Rec.Sport.Soccer Statistics Foundation
 All scorers 1974–75 European Cup according to protocols UEFA
 1974/75 European Cup - results and line-ups (archive)

1974–75 in European football
European Champion Clubs' Cup seasons